Pseudugia is a monotypic moth genus of the family Erebidae. Its only species, Pseudugia bistriata, is found in Guinea. Both the genus and species were first described by David Stephen Fletcher and Pierre Viette in 1955.

References

Calpinae
Monotypic moth genera